Edinburgh University Medics RFC is a rugby union club based in Edinburgh, Scotland.

History

The distinctive colours of the club - red, maroon and yellow - are said to represent blood, liver and pus, befitting a team of medics.

The side won the Scottish and Northern Irish Medics Sports, which was hosted in Edinburgh at Inch Park on 2 November 2019.

Honours

 Tennents East Division 3 Bowl champions 2022-23 
 SNIMS
 Champions (1): 2019-20

Notable former players

Scotland

The following former Edinburgh University Medics players have represented Scotland at international level.

References

Rugby union in Edinburgh
Scottish rugby union teams
University and college rugby union clubs in Scotland